Sophiology (by detractors also called  Sophianism
 or Sophism )  is a controversial school of thought in  Russian Orthodoxy which holds that Divine Wisdom (or Sophia) is to be identified with God's essence, and that the Divine Wisdom is in some way expressed in the world as 'creaturely' wisdom. This notion has often been understood or misunderstood (depending upon one's point of view) as introducing a feminine "fourth hypostasis" into the Trinity.

History

Antecedents 

Personified representations of Holy Wisdom (Ἁγία Σοφία) or the "Wisdom of God" refer in Orthodox theology to the person of Jesus Christ, as illustrated in the Acts of the Seventh Ecumenical Council (Nicaea II, 787): "Our Lord Jesus Christ, our true God, the self-existent Wisdom of God the Father, Who manifested Himself in the flesh, and by His great and divine dispensation (lit. economy) freed us from the snares of idolatry, clothing Himself in our nature, restored it through the cooperation of the Spirit, Who shares His mind…" More recently it has been stated that "From the most ancient times and onwards many Orthodox countries have been consecrating churches to the Lord Jesus Christ as the Wisdom of God."

Origin 
Sophiology has its roots in the early modern period, but as an explicit theological doctrine was first formulated during the 1890s to 1910s by  Vladimir Solovyov (1853–1900),  Pavel Florensky (1882–1937) and Sergei Bulgakov (1871–1944).

Subsequent controversy 
In 1935, parts of Sergius Bulgakov's doctrine of Sophia were condemned by the Patriarch of Moscow and other Russian Orthodox hierarchs. Although Bulgakov was censured by the aforementioned hierarchs, a committee commissioned by Metropolitan Eulogius to critique Bulgakov's Sophiology found his system questionable, but not heretical, and issued no formal censure (save for a minority report written by two members of the committee, Georges Florovsky and Sergei Ivanovich Chetverikov). For Bulgakov, Theotokos St. Mary was the world soul and the “Pneumatophoric hypostasis”, a Bulgakov neologism.

Thomas Merton studied the Russian Sophiologists and praised Sophia in his poem titled "Hagia Sophia" (1963). The Roman Catholic Valentin Tomberg in his magnum opus Meditations on the Tarot incorporated many Sophiological insights into his Christian Hermeticism, pairing the Holy Trinity (Father-Son-Holy Spirit) with the Trino-Sophia (Mother-Daughter-Holy Soul), which together he called “The Luminous Holy Trinity”. The book’s 2020 Angelico Press edition includes an introduction written by Robert Spaemann, a favorite theologian of Pope Benedict XVI, while its other editions feature an Afterword by Hans Urs von Balthasar. Pope John Paul II elevated von Balthasar to cardinal after having von Balthasar had endorsed this book and the pope himself photographed with Tomberg’s book on his desk and said by Richard Payne, the original English publisher, to have kept a copy on his nightstand.

Johnson (1993) and Meehan (1996) noted parallels between the Russian "sophiological" controversy and the Gender of God debate in western feminist theology.

See also 
 Holy Wisdom (iconography)
 
 
 
 Essence-energies distinction
 Sophia (wisdom)
 Sophia (Gnosticism)

References

Sources 
 Sergei Bulgakov, Sophia, the Wisdom of God: An Outline of Sophiology (Library of Russian Philosophy), Lindisfarne Books, 1993. 
 Oleg A. Donskikh, ‘Cultural roots of Russian Sophiology’, Sophia, 34(2), 1995, pp38–57
 Hunt, Priscilla, "The Novgorod Sophia Icon and 'The Problem of Old Russian Culture' Between Orthodoxy and Sophiology", Symposion: A Journal of Russian Thought, vol. 4–5, (2000), 1–41.
 Michael Martin,The Submerged Reality: Sophiology and the Turn to a Poetic Metaphysics. (Kettering, OH: Angelico Press, 2015) 
 Brenda Meehan, ‘Wisdom/Sophia, Russian identity, and Western feminist theology’, Cross Currents, 46(2), 1996, pp149–168
 Thomas Schipflinger, Sophia-Maria (in German: 1988; English translation: York Beach, ME: Samuel Wiser, 1998) 

External links 
 Lilianna Kiejzik on the emergence of the study of Sophia (Sophiology) in Russian philosophy – in Polish
 Jonathan Seiling, Kant's Third Antinomy and Spinoza's Substance in the Sophiology of Florenskii and Bulgakov – Presented at Florensky conference in Moscow, September 2005
Alexis Klimoff, On the Sophiological Controversy of the 1930s – ROCOR Studies, March 25, 2017
 Bibliography – From Mikhail Sergeev, Sophiology in Russian Orthodoxy: Solov’ev, Bulgakov, Losskii and Berdiaev.  Lewiston, New York: Edwin Mellen Press, 2006
 Divine Wisdom articles compiled by Priscilla Hunt